Pantar is the second largest island in the Indonesian Alor Archipelago, after Alor. To the east is the island of Alor and other small islands in the archipelago; to the west is the Alor Strait, which separates it from the Solor Archipelago. To the north is the Banda Sea. The main towns on the island are Baranusa and Kabir. Administratively, the island is part of the Alor Regency.

Geography
The island consists of two distinct geographic zones. The eastern zone is dominated by a range of verdant hills which drop steeply to the coast of the Alor Strait. The western zone is relatively flat, consisting of a plain which gently slopes to the west from Mount Sirung, an  active volcano. The western zone is characteristically drier and much less densely populated than the eastern zone. Owing to its relatively low elevation, the entire island is drier than neighboring Alor. The dry season is long, interspersed with heavy rainfall during the rainy season, which peaks during January and February.

History
The earliest written reference to Pantar is in the fourteenth-century Javanese poem Nagarakretagama, which describes the power and extent of the empire ruled by the fourth king of Majapahit, Hayam Wuruk. Pantar is referred to with the term 'Galiao', which is known in the Alor archipelago. The precise location of the Majapahit dependency within Pantar is a subject of discussion.

Economy
The economy is dominated by subsistence agriculture and fishing. The most common crops are rice, corn, and cassava. Crops are harvested annually in April and stored for consumption throughout the dry season. Excess production is sometimes traded for fish or to help support school children studying in the district capital of Kalabahi. Recently, commercial production of seaweed has been promoted along the north coast. A limited craft industry focused on ikat weaving is centered in Baranusa. Tourism remains underdeveloped, though a small dive resort was recently established on the northeast coast.

Transportation
Access to the island is by water only; there is no airstrip on Pantar. Small wooden power boats ply the route between Alor and Pantar daily, serving numerous communities. The state-run ferry serves  Baranusa weekly between Kalabahi (Alor) and Larantuka (Flores).

Administrative Districts 
The island comprises five districts (kecamatan) of Alor Regency, tabulated below with their areas and their populations at the 2010 census and the 2020 census, together with the official estimates as at mid 2021. The table also includes the locations of the district administrative centres, the number of villages (rural desa and urban kelurahan) in each district, and its post code. Eight small offshore islands are included within these districts.

Notes: (a) includes just the northern part of Pantar Island. (b) includes offshore islands of Pulau Kura and uninhabited Batang and Lapang. (c) includes offshore Pulau Treweng. (d) includes offshore islands of Pulau Kangge and uninhabited Kambing, Rusa and Tikus.

Languages
At least eight different languages are spoken on Pantar. These include at least five (dependent on classification) Papuan languages belonging to the Alor–Pantar family (Western Pantar, Sar, Blagar, Nedebang, and Kaera) as well as the Austronesian language Alorese. A small community of Bajau speakers is located north of Kabir. Local varieties of Malay and more standardized Indonesian are used as languages of wider communication.

See also

 List of islands of Indonesia

References

External links

 Regency of Alor website
 Van Galen's Memorandum on the Alor Islands in 1946, part 1
 Van Galen's Memorandum on the Alor Islands in 1946, part 2
 Hans Hägerdal (2010) "Cannibals and pedlars: Economic opportunity and political alliance in Alor, 1600-1850", Indonesia and the Malay World, 38 (111).

Alor Archipelago
Landforms of East Nusa Tenggara
Lesser Sunda Islands
Populated places in Indonesia